Pomaria is a genus of flowering plants in the legume family, Fabaceae. It belongs to the subfamily Caesalpinioideae.

Species
Pomaria comprises the following species:
 Pomaria austrotexana B. B. Simpson
 Pomaria brachycarpa (A. Gray) B. B. Simpson—Broadpad nicker
 Pomaria burchellii (DC.) B. B. Simpson & G. P. Lewis
 Pomaria canescens (Fisher) B. B. Simpson
 Pomaria fruticosa (S. Watson) B. B. Simpson
 Pomaria glandulosa Cav.
 Pomaria jamesii (Torr. & A. Gray) Walp.
 Pomaria lactea (Schinz) B. B. Simpson & G. P. Lewis
 Pomaria melanosticta S. Schauer—Parry's holdback
 Pomaria multijuga (S. Watson) B. B. Simpson
 Pomaria parviflora (Micheli) B. B. Simpson & G. P. Lewis
 Pomaria pilosa (Vogel) B. B. Simpson & G. P. Lewis
 Pomaria rubicunda (Vogel) B. B. Simpson & G. P. Lewis
 var. rubicunda (Vogel) B. B. Simpson & G. P. Lewis
 var. hauthalii (Harms) B. B. Simpson & G. P. Lewis
 Pomaria sandersonii (Harv.) B. B. Simpson & G. P. Lewis
 Pomaria stipularis (Vogel) B. B. Simpson & G. P. Lewis
 Pomaria wootonii (Britton) B. B. Simpson

References

Caesalpinieae
Fabaceae genera
Taxa named by Antonio José Cavanilles